The Doctors may refer to:

The Doctors (1963 TV series), a 1963–1982 American daytime soap opera
The Doctors (1969 TV series), a 1969–1971 British nighttime drama
The Doctors (2016 TV series), a South Korean drama
The Doctors (talk show), an American daytime talk show
"The Doctors" (Doctor Who), an announced title of the Doctor Who episode "Twice Upon a Time"

See also
Die Ärzte (German for "The Physicians" or "The Doctors"), a rock band
Doctor (disambiguation)